Gabriele Sadowski (born 18 February 1964) is a German chemist.

Early life and education 
Sadowski studied Chemistry at the Technical University Leuna-Merseburg from 1982 to 1987. She finished her doctorate in 1991 at the Technical University Leuna-Merseburg. She completed her dissertation at the Technical University of Berlin in 2000.

Career and research 
Her research focuses on Polymer Thermodynamics, Thermodynamics of Pharmaceutical Systems, and Reaction Thermodynamics. Since 2001, she is full professor at the Technical University of Dortmund. She took over the responsibility of prorector research in 2016.

Awards and honours 
She was awarded the Gottfried Wilhelm Leibniz Prize in 2011 and she is a member of the North Rhine-Westphalian Academy of Sciences, Humanities and the Arts.

See also 

 Timeline of women in science

References

1964 births
Living people
21st-century German chemists
German women chemists
21st-century German women scientists